East Tennessee State University (ETSU) is a public research university in Johnson City, Tennessee. Although it is part of the State University and Community College System of Tennessee, the university is governed by an institutional Board of Trustees. , it is the fourth largest university in the state and has off-campus centers in nearby Kingsport, Elizabethton, and Sevierville.

ETSU is classified among "R2: Doctoral Universities – High research activity." It hosts the James H. Quillen College of Medicine which is often ranked as one of the top schools in the United States for rural medicine and primary care education; the Bill Gatton College of Pharmacy, the College of Nursing, the College of Public Health, and the recently formed College of Clinical and Rehabilitative Health Sciences. Unique programs include an accredited program in Bluegrass, Old Time, and Country Music, America's lone master's degree in Storytelling, and the Appalachian Studies programs, focused on the surrounding Appalachian region.

History
ETSU was founded as East Tennessee State Normal School in 1911 to educate teachers; the K-12 training school, called University School, operates to this day. East Tennessee State officially became a college in 1925 when it changed its name to East Tennessee State Teachers College, subsequently gaining accreditation from the Southern Association of Colleges and Secondary Schools in 1927. By 1930, the school's name had changed again to East Tennessee State Teacher's College, Johnson City. In 1943, East Tennessee State Teacher's College was expanded into a college with a range of liberal arts offerings, becoming East Tennessee State College. The college became East Tennessee State University in 1963, adopting the name it holds today. In 1973, Shelbridge became the president's official residence.

ETSU announced plans to open a College of Pharmacy in 2005, rapidly receiving local support to secure the approval. Full accreditation was granted in June 2010, shortly after the first class of the Bill Gatton College of Pharmacy graduated.

In December 2007, the College of Public and Allied Health split into two new colleges, the College of Public Health and the College of Clinical and Rehabilitative Health Sciences. Both are part of ETSU's Health Sciences Division, which also includes the James H. Quillen College of Medicine, the Bill Gatton College of Pharmacy, and the College of Nursing.

In late 2009, the Tennessee Higher Education Commission and the Tennessee Board of Regents authorized the formation of a Ph.D. program in Sport Physiology and Performance. This program, the first of its kind in the United States, focuses on sports science and physiology in athletics. It features concentrations in sport physiology and sport performance and started in 2010.

Presidents

Sidney G. Gilbreath, 1911–1925
Charles C. Sherrod, 1925–1949
Burgin E. Dossett Sr., 1949–1968
D.P. Culp, 1968–1977
Arthur H. DeRosier Jr., 1977–1980
Ronald E. Beller, 1980–1991
Bert C. Bach (interim), 1991–1992
Roy S. Nicks, 1992–1996
Paul E. Stanton Jr., 1997–2012
Brian Noland, 2012–present

Research
The research mission of ETSU advances scholarly and creative activity that enhances the teaching and learning environment and benefits the regional, national, and global communities served.  ETSU strongly supports and encourages faculty and student research. In FY12, ETSU was awarded over $50 million in research, public service, and training/instruction grants.  The ETSU Office of Research and Sponsored Programs Administration (ORSPA) organizes an annual event, the Appalachian Student Research Forum, for students to showcase their research via poster and/or oral presentations. At the April 2012 event, over 150 student poster and oral presentations were made and over $5,000 was given in prize money to undergraduate, graduate, medical students, medical residents and postdoctoral fellows.

Athletics

ETSU collegiate athletic teams, nicknamed Buccaneers, compete in the NCAA Division I Southern Conference. The Buccaneers rejoined the Southern Conference in July 2014 after competing in the Atlantic Sun since 2003, when they dropped football. In the 2006-07 year, ETSU won both the conference's men and women's All-Sport trophies, winning seven team titles. They repeated as the overall and men's All-Sport champions in 2007–08 with three team titles, in 2008–09 with five team titles, and in 2009–10 with three team titles.  ETSU has won the Bill Bibb Trophy for the best overall Atlantic Sun athletic program all six years since it was first awarded for the 2006–07 season.

Current men's sports at ETSU are football, baseball, basketball, cross country, golf, soccer, tennis and track and field. Women's sports are basketball, cross country, golf, soccer, softball, tennis, track and field and volleyball. Men's soccer competed at the club level in the fall of 2007, before entering NCAA and Atlantic Sun competition as a scholarship program in the 2008 season.  A new on-campus soccer field, Summers-Taylor Stadium, opened in fall 2007. In the 2007–08 season, the women's basketball team made their first trip to the NCAA tournament. In 2009 and 2010, both the men's and women's teams earned automatic berths to the NCAA championship by winning the Atlantic Sun Conference tournaments. In May 2013, the ETSU Baseball team won their first ASUN Conference Championship and their second NCAA Regional berth. Kerry Doane received the Conference pitcher of the year award. He was drafted in the 24th round by the Cleveland Indians. In May 2014, ETSU Pitcher and first baseman, Clinton Freeman was drafted by the Los Angeles Dodgers organization.

On January 29, 2013, the Student Government Association voted 22-5 for a $125 per semester fee increase that would fund the reinstatement of the football program. University President Dr. Brian Noland, who was in attendance for the vote, said that fee would be sufficient to support football and Title IX requirements that support additional women's athletics. Noland told the student senators a team could be on the field by fall 2015, if the Tennessee Board of Regents approved the proposal.

On March 29, 2013, the TBR approved the $125 fee increase to reinstate football at ETSU. Dr. Noland and Athletic Director Dr. Sander hired former UNC head football coach, Carl Torbush to lead the restart of football in Johnson City, TN. Coach Torbush signed his first class in February 2014. As President Noland predicted, ETSU football began again in the fall of 2015 football season playing home games on the campus of Science Hill High School. In the fall of 2017, the William B. Greene Jr. Stadium became the new home for ETSU Football. With of the addition of football, ETSU rejoined the Southern Conference in 2014 because the A-Sun does not support the sport.

The Mini-Dome (lovingly nicknamed 'Half-Astrodome') on the campus of ETSU houses the intercollegiate athletics offices. Still known by students, faculty, and the community as the Mini-Dome, this campus landmark has been officially renamed from Memorial Center to the ETSU/Mountain States Health Alliance Athletic Center. The largest building on the ETSU campus, it hosts several indoor track and field meets, and was once the home field for the university's football program. The Mini-Dome has hosted many non-athletic events that could not be housed in an indoor setting on most American college campuses, such as national indoor championships for free flight model aircraft.

Greek life
There are several Greek organizations offered at East Tennessee State University. Greek life provides occasions for social interaction and intramural participation between young men and women. The Interfraternity Council offers young men eight fraternities: Beta Upsilon Chi Sigma Beta Rho, Kappa Sigma, Sigma Chi, Lambda Chi Alpha, Sigma Alpha Epsilon, Sigma Phi Epsilon, and Pi Kappa Alpha.  The Pan-Hellenic Council offers young women five sororities: Alpha Delta Pi, Alpha Omicron Pi, Alpha Xi Delta, Kappa Delta, and Sigma Kappa. The National Pan-Hellenic Council offers five fraternities and sororities: Alpha Kappa Alpha, Alpha Phi Alpha, Delta Sigma Theta, Omega Psi Phi, Phi Beta Sigma, and Zeta Phi Beta. Five percent of both men and women on campus are involved in Greek organizations!

Campus life

In April 2002, the  Basler Center for Physical Activity (BCPA) was opened. The building contains recreational facilities such as an indoor  climbing wall, walking / jogging track, racquetball / basketball courts, an indoor swimming pool, meeting rooms and a  weight room. The Basler Center also offers a diverse selection of fitness classes from yoga to martial arts. 
ETSU Campus Recreation completed an expansion of the BCPA in 2013 and also opened the Campus Recreation Field Complex. The BCPA expansion included a volleyball / indoor soccer/basketball court, a martial arts studio, a yoga studio, a change room, an extra 4,000 square foot area for the weight room, and a cycling studio. 
The Campus Recreation Field Complex includes Field 1- a multi-use field designed for softball and flag football and Field 2- a natural grass multi-use field designed for softball but can also accommodate flag football, soccer and other sports. There is a field house and a covered pavilion overlooking Field 1 which provides a great location for teams to gather before or after an intramural game.

Just thirty minutes from campus students can hike on the Appalachian Trail, view wildflowers in a national wilderness area, or explore the world-famous rhododendron gardens atop Roan Mountain (elevation 6,285 feet). Nearby mountain streams attract students who love trout fishing and/or waterfalls. These streams also create recreation opportunities on nearby TVA lakes for skiing, boating and bass fishing. Over the mountain ridges in North Carolina, students in winter can find snow ski resorts and lodges. An hour away to the west awaits the Great Smoky Mountains National Park and to the east the Mount Rogers National Recreation Area.

Campus buildings

Academic and administrative facilities

Charles C. Sherrod Library
The Charles C. Sherrod Library houses the Archives of Appalachia and University Archives. It has four stories above ground and offers a variety of services for university students such as 14 group study rooms, 62 individual study rooms, and a 24-hour late night study area accessible with an ETSU ID card. They have on occasion, given grade schools tours of their facility.

Residence halls

Colleges and schools
College of Arts and Sciences
College of Business and Technology
College of Clinical and Rehabilitative Health Sciences
Clemmer College
James H. Quillen College of Medicine
College of Nursing
College of Pharmacy
College of Public Health
Honors College
School of Continuing Studies
School of Graduate Studies

Honors College
The Honors College at East Tennessee State University provides unique opportunities and benefits to students in the college.

Notable people
 Donnie Abraham, cornerback, Tampa Bay Buccaneers (1996–2001)
 Eric Axley, PGA Tour golfer (1997–present)
 Barry Bales, bass player and harmony vocalist, Union Station
 David Bunton, The Showdown singer (2002–2010)
 Timothy Busfield, actor and director 
 Dave Campbell, pitcher, Atlanta Braves (1977–1978)
 Ronald E. Carrier, fourth President of James Madison University (1971–1998)
 Jo Carson, playwright, poet and fiction writer
 Darrell Castle, attorney and politician 
 Keith Cate, Emmy Award winning newscaster, Tampa, Florida
 Jamey Chadwell, head football coach Coastal Carolina (2018–present)
 Kenny Chesney, four-time Country Music Association Entertainer of the Year
 Besse Cooper, oldest person in the world from June 2011 until December 2012
 Patrick J. Cronin, professor, actor
 Neil Cusack, middle / long-distance runner, won 1974 Boston Marathon
 Rhys Davies, European Tour golfer (2010–present)
 David Davis, Tennessee state senator; U.S. Representative (2007-2009)
 David Eger, current Champions Tour golfer / former PGA Tour golfer
 Earl Ferrell, running back, St. Louis Cardinals (football) (1982–1989)
 Ray Flynn, Olympic (Ireland) middle-distance runner with 89 sub-four minute miles
 Thane Gash, safety, Cleveland Browns, San Francisco 49ers (1988–1993)
 Joseph R. Garber, author
Eddie Golden, professional wrestler 
 Ed Goodson, third baseman, San Francisco Giants, Los Angeles Dodgers (1970–1977)
 J. Ronnie Greer, US federal judge
 Steven M. Greer,  ufologist, retired traumatologist, and founder of the Center for the Study of Extraterrestrial Intelligence (CSETI)
 Atlee Hammaker, pitcher, San Francisco Giants (1981–1995)
 Diana Harshbarger, U.S. Representative from Tennessee's 1st congressional district
 Larry Hinson, PGA Tour golfer (1968–1976)
 Mike Hulbert, PGA Tour golfer (1981–2001)
 Earl Gladstone Hunt Jr., evangelist and former president of Emory and Henry College (1956–64)
 Steven James, novelist
 Keith "Mister" Jennings, NBA Golden State Warriors (1992–1995)
 Kenneth P. Johnson, newspaper editor, Dallas Times Herald
 Ric Keller, four-term US Congressman representing Florida's eighth district
 Amythyst Kiah, singer-songwriter and recording artist
 R. Alan King, awarded two Bronze Stars and author
 Herbert Theodore Milburn, US Federal Judge
 Jim Mooney, pitcher, St. Louis Cardinals, New York Giants (1931–1934)
 Eureka O'Hara, contestant on Seasons 9 and 10 of RuPaul's Drag Race
 Barclay Radebaugh, head basketball coach Charleston Southern University
 Ron Ramsey, Lieutenant Governor of Tennessee (2007–2017)
 Mo Sabri, recording artist
 Marcus Satterfield, offensive coordinator and quarterbacks coach at the University of South Carolina (2021–present).
 Bryan Lewis Saunders, visual and performance artist
 Aaron Schoenfeld (born 1990), American-Israeli forward, Maccabi Tel Aviv (2017–2020); Columbus Crew, MLS soccer (2012–2015)
 Gerald Sensabaugh, safety, Dallas Cowboys (2005–2012)
 Niall Shanks, professor, philosopher
 Mike Smith, former head coach, Atlanta Falcons
 J.C. Snead, PGA Tour golfer, member of Ryder Cup teams in 1971, 1973, 1975
 Adam Steffey, bluegrass mandolinist (Alison Krauss & Union Station, Mountain Heart)
 Harley Swift, ABA, San Antonio Spurs (1969–1974)
 Phyllis Tickle, author and lecturer
 Jack Vest, collegiate athlete and American Football League / NFL official, Super Bowl II referee
 Bobby Wadkins, PGA Tour golfer (1973–2011)
 Garrett Willis, PGA Tour golfer (1995–present)
 Tommy Woods, basketball player, ABA, first African-American player at ETSU, locker room named for him

See also
 East Tennessee State University Arboretum
 Gray Fossil Site
 WETS-FM

References

External links

 
 ETSU Athletics website

 
East Tennessee
Educational institutions established in 1911
Johnson City, Tennessee
Universities and colleges accredited by the Southern Association of Colleges and Schools
Education in Washington County, Tennessee
Buildings and structures in Washington County, Tennessee
Education in Sullivan County, Tennessee
Education in Carter County, Tennessee
Public universities and colleges in Tennessee
1911 establishments in Tennessee